Dundaga parish is an administrative unit of Talsi Municipality in the Courland region of Latvia.

Villages of Dundaga parish 
 Dundaga

Parishes of Latvia
Talsi Municipality
Courland